, known professionally as , is a Japanese actor and singer. He won the Japan Academy Film Prize for Outstanding Performance by an Actor in a Leading Role. His debut song is "Mita Koto mo Nai Keshiki".

Personal life 
Suda is a close junior to Shun Oguri and Takayuki Yamada. His friends are Kento Yamazaki, Taiga Nakano and Fumi Nikaido. He worked with Kenshi Yonezu, Huwie Ishizaki and Aimyon at the music industry. Suda married Nana Komatsu on November 15, 2021.

Career

Acting 
Suda met talent agents while at school. He had several auditions, and was a finalist at Amuse, Inc. and Junon Superboy Contest. He played Philip in the tokusatsu series, Kamen Rider W. His film debut after Kamen Rider was in The Backwater. He won the Best New Actor Award at Tama Cinema Forum. He played Akuma in Shinigami-kun and Karma Akabane in Assassination Classroom. Suda starred in the web series Death Note: New Generation and its subsequent film. He won the Japan Academy Film Prize for Outstanding Performance by an Actor in a Leading Role in Wilderness and starred in My Little Monster.

Music 
He appeared in the biopic film about Hide of the group Greeeen. They released an EP, Green Boys. Suda released a few albums, Play and Love.

Filmography

Film

Television

Dubbing

Discography

Albums

Extended play

Singles

Awards

References

External links 
 
 
 

1993 births
Living people
People from Minoh, Osaka
21st-century Japanese male actors
21st-century Japanese male singers